Sergio Di Stefano (5 July 1939 – 17 September 2010) was an Italian actor and voice actor, known for being the official dubber of Jeff Bridges, John Malkovich and in his well noted performances, Hugh Laurie.

Biography
In the 1960s, Di Stefano attended the Silvio d'Amico National Academy of Dramatic Arts and began his acting career on stage and on television. He then approached the world of dubbing during the 1970s and became well known for giving his voice to actors like John Malkovich, Jeff Bridges, Alan Rickman, William Hurt and especially Hugh Laurie as Gregory House in the first six seasons of House and Jonathan Frakes as William Riker in Star Trek: The Next Generation.

Di Stefano was also noted for dubbing Christopher Lambert, Christopher Reeve, Alec Baldwin, Jeff Goldblum and Robert Englund in some of their performances. In his animated roles, He voiced Johnny Bravo in the Italian dub of Johnny Bravo as well as Dr. Cockroach in the Italian dub of Monsters vs Aliens.

Death
Di Stefano died of a heart attack on 17 September 2010 at the age of 71. After his death, his colleague Luca Biagini became the new voice dubber of Hugh Laurie in the remaining seasons of House.

Dubbing roles

Animation
 Johnny Bravo in Johnny Bravo
 Dad in Cow and Chicken
 King Goobot V in Jimmy Neutron: Boy Genius
 Lord Barkins Bittern in Corpse Bride
 Dr. Cockroach in Monsters vs. Aliens
 Dr. Cockroach in Monsters vs. Aliens: Mutant Pumpkins from Outer Space
 Plo Koon in Star Wars: The Clone Wars
 Vincent Van Ghoul in The 13 Ghosts of Scooby-Doo

Live action
Gregory House in House (seasons 1-6)
William Riker in Star Trek: The Next Generation
William Riker in Star Trek Generations
William Riker in Star Trek: First Contact
William Riker in Star Trek: Insurrection
William Riker in Star Trek: Nemesis
Jeff Peters in Making Mr. Right
Mitch Leary in In the Line of Fire
General Timms in Mulholland Falls
Doctor Henry Jekyll / Edward Hyde Mary Reilly
Athos in The Man in the Iron Mask
Charles VII of France in The Messenger: The Story of Joan of Arc
F. W. Murnau in Shadow of the Vampire
Tom Ripley in Ripley's Game 
Pascal Sauvage in Johnny English
Craig Blake in Stay Hungry
Scott Hayden in Starman
Jack Forrester in Jagged Edge
Jack Lucas in The Fisher King
Gregory Larkin in The Mirror Has Two Faces
Jeffrey "The Dude" Lebowski in The Big Lebowski
Jackson Evans in The Contender
Charles S. Howard in Seabiscuit
Otis "Bad" Blake in Crazy Heart
Marcus Sommers in American Flyers
Eliot Ness in The Untouchables
"Crash" Davis in Bull Durham
Ray Kinsella in Field of Dreams
Kenneth O'Donnell in Thirteen Days
Dr. Joe Darrow in Dragonfly
Earl Brooks in Mr. Brooks
Colonel Brandon in Sense and Sensibility
Metatron in Dogma
Marvin the Paranoid Android in The Hitchhiker's Guide to the Galaxy
Antoine Richis in Perfume: The Story of a Murderer
Eli Michaelson in Nobel Son
Absolem in Alice in Wonderland
Agent Gibbs in Air Force One
Narrator in Two Bits
Robert “Bob” Green in The Edge
Narrator in The Royal Tenenbaums
Jimmy Doolittle in Pearl Harbor
Joe Devine in The Last Shot
Campbell Alexander in My Sister's Keeper
Frank Bumstead in Dark City
Allen Hobby in A.I. Artificial Intelligence
Sponsor in Changing Lanes
Angus Tuck in Tuck Everlasting
Edward Walker in The Village
Stan Goff in Syriana
Philip Allen in The Good Shepherd
Freddy Krueger in A Nightmare on Elm Street 4: The Dream Master
Freddy Krueger in Freddy's Dead: The Final Nightmare
Freddy Krueger / Robert Englund in Wes Craven's New Nightmare
William 'Bill' Gartley in The Mangler
Fred in Subway
Connor MacLeod in Highlander
Connor MacLeod in Highlander II: The Quickening
Connor MacLeod in Highlander: Endgame
Father Alek in To Kill a Priest
John Henry Brennick in Fortress
Clark Kent / Superman in Superman IV: The Quest for Peace
Jack Lewis in The Remains of the Day
Ryan in Freaky Friday
Vasily Borodin in The Hunt for Red October
Robert MacLean in The Horse Whisperer
Richard Martin in Bicentennial Man
James Biggs in Street Kings
Meyer Lansky in Bugsy
Feste in Twelfth Night
Lord Augustus in A Good Woman
Paul Emmett in The Ghost Writer
Santiago in Interview with the Vampire
Henry Miles in The End of the Affair
Alejandro Sosa in Scarface
George Moscone in Milk

References

External links

 
 
 

1939 births
2010 deaths
Male actors from Rome
Italian male voice actors
Italian male television actors
Italian male stage actors
Italian voice directors
Accademia Nazionale di Arte Drammatica Silvio D'Amico alumni
20th-century Italian male actors
21st-century Italian male actors